The fifth season of Winx Club premiered on Nickelodeon in the United States on 26 August 2012 and on Rai 2 in Italy on 16 October 2012. It is the first season produced with Nickelodeon.

It is the first full season in the Winx Club revival series, following the 2011 specials that summarized seasons 1–2 of the original show.

In this season, the Winx face a threat underwater and will have to face a new dreadful villain, Tritannus. He was a normal triton who was mutated into a powerful demon sea monster caused by pollution. His main goal is to become the emperor of the Infinite Ocean. He allies with the Trix and the leader, Icy, falls in love with him. The Believix power is not strong enough underwater, so the Winx start a challenging quest to get the ancient Sirenix power and become ocean fairies.

Production and broadcast
This was the first season to be produced with Nickelodeon, the first produced in HD and the first to use computer-animated graphics. Scenes using Harmonix were in 2D, while scenes set in world of the Infinite Ocean were rendered in CGI. "The Lilo" was broadcast as the season premiere in the United States, Romania, Australia, The Netherlands, Poland, Hungary, The Czech Republic, Germany and Canada. However, this was the fifth episode produced for the season. It premiered on 26 August 2012 on Nickelodeon in the United States, and on 16 October 2012 on Rai 2 in Italy, spanning 26 episodes. Like the sixth and seventh seasons, this season premiered on Nickelodeon networks worldwide ahead of the Italian broadcasts.

Episode list

References

Winx Club